Clifton George Bailey III (born 13 April 1967), better known by his stage name Capleton, is a Jamaican reggae and dancehall musician. He is also referred to as King Shango, King David, The Fireman and The Prophet. His record label is called David House Productions. He is known for his Rastafari views expressed in his songs.

Early life 
Bailey was born in Islington in St. Mary in 1967. As a youth, he was given the surname of a popular St. Mary lawyer and friend of the family, Capleton, as a nickname by his relatives and friends.
Capleton rejects the name given to him at birth. He now prefers "King Shango", given its roots in the Yoruba language.

As a teenager, he sneaked out of his home to catch local dancehall acts, eventually leaving St. Mary for Kingston at the age of 18 to work on his career as a dancehall deejay.

Career

Early career 

In 1989, he got his first big international exposure. Stewart Brown, owner of a Toronto-based sound called African Star, gave the untested artist his first break, flying him to Canada for a stage show alongside Ninjaman and Flourgon.

When Capleton first arrived on the scene in the late 1980s, slackness and gun talk were the dominant lyrics in the dancehalls. The pre-Rasta Capleton had a string of hit songs from "Bumbo Red" to "Number One on the Look Good Chart" and "No Lotion Man".

He recorded the song that began to establish his significant place in Dancehall, "Alms House" in 1992. The tune became a big hit in the dancehall, followed up immediately by "Music is a Mission" and the massive hit "Tour". By 1993, he was voicing tunes which became increasingly conscious, such as "Prophet" and "Cold Blooded Murderer".

Tunes such as "Tour" and "Wings of the Morning" earned him a deal with Russell Simmons' Def Jam Recordings, which culminated in the Prophecy and I-Testament albums of the mid-1990s.
Grammy Nominated in 2003 Album "Still Blazin" VP Records Executive Produce by Errol "GenErral" Adams / Joel Chin

Later career 

In 1999, Capleton headlined Reggae Sumfest's dancehall night, to much fanfare. The performance, which led to a subsequent headliner placement the following year, is credited with "re-bussing", or creating a comeback for, his career.
The 1999–2000 period elicited a string of hits, many of which can be found on the album More Fire.

Grammy Nominated in 2003 Album "Still Blazin" VP Records Executive Produce by Errol "GenErral" Adams / Joel Chin

By 2004, some argued the quality of Capleton's music had been downgraded by over-proliferation on numerous riddims, while Capleton himself argued his continued recording over both dancehall and roots reggae riddims created balance in his musical output. Nonetheless, he scored hit singles over one of the most popular riddims of 2004, "That Day Will Come" over the Hard Times riddim.

After a hiatus from the label, Capleton returned to VP Records in 2010 with the release of I-Ternal Fire.

After headlining a U.S. tour which included Romain Virgo, Munga Honorable, and Kulcha Knox in the fall of 2010, Capleton embarked upon a tour of the African continent for late 2010 and early 2011. Stops included Gambia, Senegal, South Africa and multiple dates in Zimbabwe. In December 2012 the music Unite Cape Town International Reggae Festival saw Capleton, reggae and dancehall artists like Black Dillinger, Blak Kalamawi .

Capleton's annual 'A St Mary Mi Come From' live show has raised funds for several charities since it was first staged in 2000, including local schools and hospitals.

Religious views 
Capleton makes reference to Bobo Ashanti, one of the various mansions of the Rastafari movement. Yet he frequently mentions there's no separation between the mansions of Rastafari as he sees it. He stated in an interview on TraceTV that he is a vegan, not consuming meat or dairy in any form, but he also rejects anything made from soya. He also touches on the subject of his lyrics regarding fire, saying they are metaphoric references of purification, not violence or murder.

Criticisms 
Capleton has faced criticism for anti-gay lyrics in some of his songs though homosexuality remains illegal in his native Jamaica. His manager has argued that some of the controversial lyrics have been mistranslated and do not actually refer to gays. Capleton himself has admitted that through his Rastafari faith he believes that a homosexual lifestyle is not right, but has insisted that terms such as "burn" and "fire" are not to be understood in the literal sense "to go out and burn and kill people", but as a metaphor for "purification" and cleansing. As part of an agreement to end the Stop Murder Music campaign, Capleton and other artists allegedly signed the Reggae Compassionate Act (RCA) in 2007.

However, Capleton has continued to sing songs that some claim violate the RCA, causing the cancellation of a concert in Switzerland in 2008 and a United States tour in 2010.

Discography 

Lotion Man – 1991
Alms House – 1993
Good So – 1994
Prophecy – 1995
I-Testament – 1997
One Mission (compilation) – 1999
Gold – 2000
More Fire – 2000
Final Assassin – 2000
Still Blazin''' – 2002Voice of Jamaica, Vol.3 – 2003Praises to the King – 2003Reign of Fire – 2004The People Dem – 2004Duppy Man (featured with Chase & Status)Free Up – 2006Hit Wit Da 44 Rounds – 2007Rise Them Up – 2007Bun Friend – 2008Yaniko Roots – 2008Jah Youth Elevation – 2008Liberation Time (featured with AZAD) (2009)I-Ternal Fire – 2010Ova Come'' (featured with Gisto) – 2020

References

External links 

Capleton's profile at VP Records' website
History of Capleton
Capleton Biography

Jamaican reggae musicians
1967 births
Living people
People from Saint Mary Parish, Jamaica
Jamaican Rastafarians
Def Jam Recordings artists
Performers of Rastafarian music
Jamaican dancehall musicians
Jamaican songwriters
VP Records artists
Greensleeves Records artists